Spring News is a Thai Television news channel owned by Spring News Television Ltd. part of News Network Corporation PCL. (formerly Solution Corner 1998 PCL.)

Spring News debuted on satellite television via test broadcast on 5 March 2010. Its official launch of Spring News was on 15 December 2010

Spring News won the licence for Digital television for news and information channel from the NBTC's spectrum auction in 2013. Spring News started broadcasting on Digital Television from 1 April 2014 on LCN Channel 19.

On 24 November 2016, Spring News inked a partnership deal with international news network CNN for using content, news footage and training for employees, and on 1 January 2017, Spring News began using CNN-themed on-screen graphics.

Programming 
 Spring News broadcast 24-hour rolling news coverage throughout the day called "The Phenomenon of Real News" (ปรากฎการณ์ข่าวจริง) with exception of variety programming and infotainment program on weekends.  Rolling news start at 6 am (ICT)  and One Minute News Updates every top of the hour and every half-hour.

Non-news live programming 
 Live Telecast of Thai lottery draw every 1st and 16th of every month at 14:30–16:00 (ICT) (simulcast Second and last hour with National Broadcasting Services of Thailand)

Affiliate programming  
From CNN International:
 Anderson Cooper 360°
 Quest Means Business	
 Amanpour
 Hollywood Express
 The Silk Road
 CNN Styles

References

External links
 Spring News (Thai)
Program Schedule

News Network Corporation
24-hour television news channels in Thailand
24-hour television news channels
Television stations in Thailand
Television channels and stations established in 2010